Rosa Paula Iribagiza Mwambutsa (born 20 March 1934) is the current pretender to the throne of Burundi and a member of that nation's parliament. She was a sister of Burundi's last king, Mwami Ntare V (who had overthrown their father Mwambutsa IV in 1966), who was executed in 1972. In 2009, the Crown Princess called for an investigation into the death of her brother.

Family 
She married twice.

With her first husband, Chief André Muhirwa of Busumanyi, she had two sons and two daughters.

 Prince Rémy Ciza Muhirwa. He married Pascale Hody (later divorced). Later, he married Michèle Ingabire Gateretse. He has 4 issue
 Prince Charles Muhirwa.
 Princess Louise Muhirwa (born in Muhinga, on 29 April 1956 - died 25 December 2019). Married to Camille Ngoga.
 Princess Michelle Muhirwa.

The Crown Princess also had issue by François Bourgeon, a French national, one daughter:

 Anita Iribagiza (born on 15 October 1970). Actress.

Also Princess Rosa Paula had further issue by Hamisi Masud Kiliza, one son and one daughter:

 Sheila Babile Kiliza (born in Nairobi, Kenya, on 16 June 1973 - died 29 January 2020).
 David Kabunga wa Mwambutsa Hamisi Kiliza (born in Nairobi, Kenya, on 2 July 1974).

Distinctions 
 : Commander of the Order of the Crown (14 May 2012)

Ancestry

References

Living people
Pretenders
Burundian royalty
1934 births
Commanders of the Order of the Crown (Belgium)
People from Gitega Province
Ganwa people